Walney North is one of two wards on Walney Island in the Borough of Barrow-in-Furness, North West England. The 2001 UK census showed 5,604 people were living in the area, reducing to 5,304 at the 2011 Census.

Walney North consists of several settlements including North Walney, North Scale and the northern area of Vickerstown. The ward is also home to Barrow/Walney Island Airport.

The ward will be combined with Walney South ward in April 2023 following formation of the new Westmorland and Furness Local Authority and be named simply 'Walney Island'.

References

Wards of Barrow-in-Furness